Milenko Stefanović (19 February 1930 – 25 July 2022) was a Serbian classical and jazz clarinetist. He was a prizewinner in the international competitions in Moscow, Munich, Geneva and Prague, and achieved an international career as a soloist. He was a long-time principal clarinetist of the Belgrade Philharmonic Orchestra and Professor of Clarinet at the University of Priština and University of the Arts in Belgrade.

Education

Born in Belgrade, Kingdom of Yugoslavia (present day Serbia) in a family of amateur musicians, he began his musical studies  at the age of five (violin, piano and, later, clarinet). His first clarinet teacher was Franjo Partlić, principal clarinetist of the Belgrade Opera. Stefanović graduated from the Belgrade Music Academy, as a student of Professor Bruno Brun, the founder of modern Serbian school of clarinet playing (1957). He completed there, with the same teacher, his postgraduate studies and was awarded  the Magister of Arts degree (1971). Additionally, he studied chamber and orchestral playing in Salzburg, Austria in the class of Igor Markevich, Erich Leinsdorf and Fernand Oubradous.

Awards and honors

Stefanović  was a top-prize winner or finalist in the major Yugoslavian and international competitions, including the competitions in Sarajevo (1952), Skopje (1954), Ljubljana (1956), Moscow (1957), Munich (1957), Geneva (1957) and Prague (1959). Additionally, he was presented with the Award of the Yugoslavian Radio-Television (Ohrid, 1972), awards of the City of Belgrade for the best concert in the previous concert season  (1976, 1981, 1986), with 7 July Award (1962) – the state's highest award for the arts, as well as with many other honors. In 2007, upon recommendation of the Expert Committee of the Serbian Ministry of Culture, he was awarded Special Acknowledgment for the Highest Contribution to the National Culture in the Republic of Serbia. In 2010 he was awarded The Lifetime Achievement Award by the Association of Musical Artists of Serbia. In 2011, at the ClarinetFest® in Northridge, California, the membership of the International Clarinet Association unanimously voted Stefanović to become an Honorary Member.  On behalf of Milenko Stefanović, his granddaughter Irina received the Award on 27 July 2013, at the I.C.A. Awards Ceremony, during the ClarinetFest® in Assisi, Italy. On 12 February 2016, in Belgrade, Serbia, President of the European Clarinet Association Stephan Vermeersch awarded Professor Stefanović with the European Clarinet Association Honorary Membership for Lifetime Achievements in Performance, Teaching and Professional Service.

Performance career

Stefanović was the principal clarinetist of the Belgrade Philharmonic Orchestra (1954–1976).
Apart from holding that position, he also achieved international success  as a soloist and chamber music player. 

During his extensive career, Stefanović has played in Europe, North America and Africa. As a soloist, chamber and orchestral musician he has collaborated with Yugoslavian and international artists, including:  Sir Malcolm Sargent, Sir John Barbirolli, Herbert von Karajan, Lorin Maazel, Leopold Stokowski, Kirill Kondrashin, Bernard Keeffe, Francesco Mander, Jerzy Katlewicz, Jovan Šajnović, Uroš Lajovic, Anton Kolar, Anton Nanut, Vančo Čavdarski, Živojin Zdravković, Oskar Danon, Dušan Skovran, Djura Jakšić, Mladen Jagušt, Julio Marić, Franc Klinar, Roman Skrepek, Eric Hope, Evgeni Koroliov, Michel Dussault, Andreja Preger, Nikola Rackov, Aleksandar Pavlović, Viktor Jakovčić, Zorica Dimitrijević-Stošić, Mirjana Kršljanin, Aleksandar Lekovski, Zbigniew  Chwedczuk, Josef Daniel, Oivin Fjeldstad, Bogo Leskovic, Petr Vronsky, Freddy Došek, Milan Horvat, Bogdan Babić, Dušan Miladinović, Božidar Tumpej, Vojislav Simić, The Zagreb Soloists, The Belgrade Trio, The Serbian String Quartet, and The Zagreb Quartet.

Stefanović was one of the few artists to perform  Copland's Clarinet Concerto under the baton of  Maestro Aaron Copland (1961). 

Stefanović was also a jazz musician – soloist, composer and member of the Belgrade Jazz Trio and Markićević Quintet. 

He has  recorded  for the radio and television stations in Yugoslavia and abroad  (Moscow, Rome, Paris, London, Berlin...

A number of Yugoslavian composers Aleksandar Obradović, Petar Bergamo, Dušan Radić, Miodrag Ilić, Petar Ozgijan, Dejan Despić, and others dedicated to him their works. 

Stefanović has been highly esteemed by the critics. Despite the great number of his appearances, he is one of the very few musicians who have never been reviewed negatively by the critics. 

Stefanović has served on the juries in Yugoslavian and international competitions (Belgrade, Warsaw, Zurich...)

Compositions
Stefanovic wrote many jazz compositions and some film music.

Teaching career

Stefanović has been very successful as a teacher, too. His former students hold teaching positions in music schools and universities and  play in orchestras in Europe, Asia, Australia and North America. Many of them were prizewinners in various competitions in the country and abroad.

He began his teaching career as a clarinet teacher at the Josip Slavenski School of Music (1967–1993). 

He taught at the University of the Arts in Belgrade from 1976,  when he was appointed upon recommendation of the previous teacher, Professor Brun, until his retirement in 1995. 

Stefanović taught at the University of Priština Faculty of Arts from 1975, when he was one of the founders of its Music Division, until 2009. 

He was also a Vice-Chancellor (1985–1989) and member of the Board of Trustees of the University of the Arts in Belgrade.

Stefanović wrote several textbooks for the clarinet students.

Affiliations
Stefanović was a member and former president (1977–1980) of the Association of Musical Artists of Serbia and Honorary Member of the International Clarinet Association (awarded in 2013) and European Clarinet Association (awarded in 2016).
He was a member of the Council of the Belgrade Music Festival (BEMUS) and member of the Publishing Council of Pro musica journal.

Family
Two members of Stefanović's family are also well-known musicians: his son Predrag is a clarinetist and his daughter-in-law Jovana is a composer. Both of them have built significant music careers. Beside that, they are also very esteemed as pedagogues. They have been teaching at the Josip Slavenski School of Music in Belgrade. In that school their child, Milenko's granddaughter, named Irina plays piano but she also composes.

Selected recordings

 Baird: Two Caprices
 Baronijan: Divertimento for Clarinet, Flute, Strings and Percussion
 Bećiri: Sonata
 Berg: Four Pieces
 Bergamo: Concerto Abbreviato for Clarinet Solo (dedicated to M. Stefanović)
 Beethoven: Duo No.2, Op. 147 for Clarinet and Bassoon (with Božidar Tumpej)
 Bjelinski: Rondo
 Brahms: Sonata No. 1
Brahms:Sonata No. 2
Brahms: Quintet in B minor (with the Zagreb Quartet)
 Copland: Concerto (with Aaron Copland)
Cossetto: Clarinet Concerto
 Debussy: Premiere Rhapsodie (with Symphony Orchestra of the Radio Television of Belgrade conducted by Oskar Danon)
 Despić: Concertino for Clarinet, Bassoon & Orchestra (with Božidar Tumpej, basoon, and Symphony Orchestra of the Radio Television of Serbia, conducted by Mladen Jagušt)
Despić: Nine Dances for Clarinet Solo (dedicated to M. Stefanović)
 Frajt: The Player and the Birds (with Symphony Orchestra of the Radio Television of Belgrade conducted by Dušan Miladinović)
 Hindemith: Sonata
 Honegger: Sonatine (with Eric Hope)
 Kalčić: Musica Concertante for Clarinet solo and Strings<ref>RBG3, 6 July 2002</ref<refTijana Popović Mlađenović, Aleksandar Pavlović
Anthology of the Serbian Music of the 20th Century for Strings –
The premiere performances of the Belgrade String Orchestra ‘Dušan Skovran’ New Sound No. 32, pp. 258–260</ref>
 Kessel: Bernardo
 Kotlić: Pesma
 Lutoslawski: Dance Preludes
 Milhaud: Concerto (with Oskar Danon)
Milhaud: Sonatina
 Mozart: Concerto in A major K. 622
Mozart: Trio in E-flat major, K. 498 (Kegelstatt Trio)
Mozart: Quintet in A major, K.581 (with the Zagreb Quartet)
 Obradović: Concerto for Clarinet and String Orchestra (with the Radio Television Belgrade String Orchestra, conducted by Vančo Čavdarski, and with the strings of the Zagreb Philharmonic Orchestra, conducted by Milan Horvat)

Obradović: Microsonata for Clarinet Solo (dedicated to M. Stefanović)

 Penderecki: Three Miniatures
 Rabaud: Solo de Concours
 Radić: Concertino (dedicated to M. Stefanović)
 Rossini: Introduction, Theme and Variations
 Schumann: Fantasy-Pieces
 Saint-Saëns: Sonata (with Zorica Dimitrijević-Stošić)
 Shaw: Concerto
 Stamitz: Concerto in B flat major
 Stefanović: Romance
Stefanović: Grotesque
 Stravinsky: Three Pieces 
 Vauda: Sonata Brevis
 Weber: Concertino (recordings with the BBC Orchestra and with Symphony Orchestra of the Radio Television of Belgrade conducted by Oskar Danon)
Weber: Concerto No. 1
Weber: Concerto No. 2
 Živanović: Spring Landscape
Živanović: Rhapsody for Clarinet and Jazz Orchestra
 Živković: Pean, for violin, flute, clarinet and bassoon

Notes

References 
Barker, John Craig. “The Jeunesses Musicales Belgrade International Competition.” The Clarinet Vol. 15/2 (February–March  1988), pp. 38–39.
Blagojević, Andrija. Pregled istorijskog razvoja klarineta i literature za klarinet. Zvečan: Fakultet umetnosti, 2010.
Blagojevic, Andrija, and Milan Milosevic. "Milenko Stefanovic Awarded The Lifetime Achievement Award." The Clarinet Vol. 37/4 (September 2010), p. 17.
Blagojevic, Andrija, and Milan Milosevic. "Trio PON Won International Competition in Kragujevac, Serbia." The Clarinet Vol. 38/1 (December 2010), pp. 11–12.
Blagojevic, Andrija. “Ante Grgin – clarinetist and composer.” The Clarinet  Vol. 39/1 (December 2011), pp. 44–45
Blagojevic, Andrija. “Jeunesses Musicales International Competition in Belgrade, Serbia.“  The Clarinet  Vol. 39/4 (September 2012), pp. 78–84.
Blagojevic, Andrija."Bruno Brun (1910–1978) – Founder of the Yugoslav clarinet school."  The Clarinet, Vol. 41/3 (June 2014), pp. 46–51.
Blagojevic, Andrija. “Tenth International Competition Young Virtuosos in Sofia, Bulgaria.” The Clarinet,  Vol. 41/4 (September 2014), pp. 92–93.
Blagojević, Andrija. "Milenko Stefanović Receives ECA Lifetime Achievement Award."  The Clarinet, Vol. 43/4 (September 2016), pp. 8–9.
Blagojević, Andrija. "Serbische Klarinettengesellschaft gegründet.” ‘rohrblatt, 31 (2016), Heft 3, pp.  130–131.
Blagojević, Andrija. "Der Klarinettist Milenko Stefanović erhielt die Ehrenmitgliedschaft der European Clarinet Association.” ‘rohrblatt, 31 (2016), Heft 3, pp.  131–132.
Blagojević, Andrija. "Dejan Despić. Neun Tänze/Devet igara/Nine Dances Op. 62 für Klarinette Solo." The Clarinet, Vol. 45/3 (December 2016), pp. 66–68.
Blagojević, Andrija. "Profesor Milenko Stefanović – dobitnik najprestižnijeg evropskog priznanja.“ Putevi kulture – časopis za kulturu i umetnost, No. 26 (2017), pp. 96–98;
Blagojević, Andrija. "Milenko Stefanović and his Collaboration with Composers."  The Clarinet, Vol. 45/3 (June 2018), pp. 32–37.
Blagojević, Andrija. "Zlatan Vauda. Sonata brevis for clarinet and piano."  The Clarinet, Vol. 45/3 (June 2018), pp. 71.
Blagojević, Andrija. "Belgrade SAXperience: Internationales Saxophon Festival." 'rohrblatt 34 (2019), Heft 4, pp. 178–179.
Blagojević, Andrija. "The Performance Career of Bruno Brun."  The Clarinet, Vol. 47/3 (June 2020), pp. 34–37.
Blagojević, Andrija. "Profesor Milenko Stefanović (1930-2022)."  Triptih: interdisciplinarni naučni časopis o umetnosti i kulturi/the interdisciplinary scientific journal of art and culture, Vol. 2/1 (2022), pp. 161-165.
Blagojević, Andrija. "A Tribute to Milenko Stefanović."  The Clarinet, Vol. 50/2 (March 2023), pp. 9–10.
Brun, Bruno. "Duvački instrumenti u Muzičkoj akademiji." in Dvadeset pet godina Muzičke akademije u Beogradu: 1937–1962. Beograd: [Muzička akademija], 1963, pp. 62–67.
Bryant, Michael. “The Clarinet on record.” In The Cambridge Companion to the Clarinet, edited by Colin Lawson, pp. 199–212. Cambridge: Cambridge University Press, 1995.
Campagnolo, Gianluca.  The Great Clarinettists. Modica: the author, 2010.
Cipolla, John. “The President's Message.” The Clarinet, Vol 40/2 (March 2013), p. 106.
Dvadeset pet godina Muzičke akademije u Beogradu: 1937–1962. Beograd: [Muzička akademija], 1963.
Dizon, Kristine. "Croatian Clarinet Concertos." Clarinet & Saxophone, Vol. 43, No. 1 (Spring 2018), pp. 22–25.
Đurić-Klajn, Stana. Istorijski razvoj muzičke kulture u Srbiji. Beograd: Pro musica, 1971.
Eberst, Anton. Klarinet i klarinetisti. Novi Sad: Forum, [1963].
Eberst, Anton and Milan Čuljak.Šta treba da se zna o duvačkim instrumentima. Novi Sad: Udruženje muzičkih pedagoga, 1958.
Ikonomova, Vera. Živojin Zdravković i zlatna epoha Beogradske filharmonije.  Beograd: Clio, Jugokoncert, 1999.
Jugokoncert: 1946–1971, ed. by Milena Milanović.  Belgrade: Yugoslav concert agency, 1971.
Krajačić, Gordana. Muzičke beleške. Beograd: the author, 2012.
Krajačić, Gordana. "In memoriam - Milenko Mima Stefanović," Blic, August 9, 2022, p. 23
Lončarević, Dušan. “Porterti umetnika – Milenko Stefanović”.” Pro musica No. 2 (January 1965), pp. 2–3.
Maglov, Marija. The Best of: umetnička muzika u PGP-u. Beograd: Fakultet za medije i komunikacije, 2016.
Maksimović, Miodrag. Beogradska filharmonija 1951–1971. Beograd: Beogradska filharmonija, 1971.
Milenković, Živomir. "Priznanje stiglo iz Kalifornije." Prosvetni pregled (14–21 June 2012), p. 11.
Milenković, Živomir. "Milenku Stefanoviću, univerzitetskom profesoru i legendarnom srpskom klarinetisti  – Evropska nagrada za životno delo."  Prosvetni pregled  (10 March 2016), p. 10
"Milenko Stefanović (1930-2022)." Clarinet & Saxophone Vol. 47, No. 4 (Winter 2022), ed. by Catherine Smith, p. 10; Retrieved on 29 December, 2022.
Milutinović, Žika. “Poslušni klarinet,“ Ilustrovana politika, No. 369 (November 30, 1965), p. 29
Mišić, Radmila. Živeti uz note. Kruševac: Muzička škola "Stevan Hristić", 2001.
Mošić, Andro. Markov prozor. Beograd: KK "Branko Ćopić", 2011.
"Na međunarodnom festivalu u Italiji." Grad, 6 September 2013, p. 19.
Odom, David. "A Catalog of Compositions for Unaccompanied Clarinet Published between 1978 and 1982 with an Annotated Bibliography of Selected Works." D.M.A. diss., Florida State University, 2005.
Pejović, Roksanda. “Domaći umetnici u izgradnji muzičkog života." Pro musica no. 79-80 (1975), pp. 32–33.
Pejović, Roksanda. “Jugoslovenska dela na repertoaru beogradskih umetnika.” Pro musica no. 79-80 (1975), pp. 33–35.
Pejović, Roksanda. “Jugoslovenski umetnici sa orkestrom Filharmonije.” Pro musica no. 79-80 (1975), pp. 38–39.
Pejović, Roksanda. Oskar Danon.   Beograd: Univerzitet umetnosti u Beogradu, 1986.
Pejović, Roksanda, ed. Pedeset godina Fakulteta muzičke umetnosti (Muzičke akademije) 1937–1987. Beograd: Univerzitet umetnosti u Beogradu, 1988.
Peričić, Vlastimir, with Dušan Kostić and Dušan Skovran.Muzički stvaraoci u Srbiji. Beograd:  Prosveta, [1969].
Petrović, Dragoslav. NIMUS – Niške muzičke svečanosti: 1975–2004. Niš: Punta, 2006.
Plavša, Dušan. Muzika – Prošlost, sadašnjost, ličnosti, oblici. Knjaževac: Izdavačka organizacija "Nota", 1981.
Popović Mlađenović, Tijana. ”Aleksandar Pavlović: Anthology of the Serbian Music of 20th Century for Strings – The premiere performances of the Belgrade String Orchestra ’Dušan Skovran’.” New Sound  32 (2008), pp. 291–293.
Preger, Andreja. Stoleće uz muziku. Beograd: Fakultet muzičke umetnosti, 2007.
"Priznanje klarinetisti Milenku Stefanoviću." Politika, 7 September 2013, p. 12.
Ramey, Maxine. “I.C.A. General Business Meeting – Honorary Members.” The Clarinet, Vol. 39/1 (December 2011), pp. 92–94.
Ramey, Maxine. “I.C.A. General Business Meeting – Honorary Members.” The Clarinet, Vol. 40/1 (December 2012), pp. 98–101.
Stefanović, Milenko. Laki komadi. Beograd: Milivoj Ivanović, 1970.
Stefanović, Milenko. Orkestarske studije za klarinet (2 vols.). Knjaževac: Izdavačka organizacija „Nota“, 1979.
Stojković, Milica. Bila sam svedok: Muzička produkcija RTB 1976–1992. Beograd: RDU Radio-televizija Srbije, 2011.
Veselinovć Hofman Mirjana, ed. Istorija srpske muzike – Srpska muzika i evropsko muzičko nasleđe. Beograd: Zavod za udžbenike, 2007.
Walzel, Robert. “The Belgrade Competition – A First Hand Account.” The Clarinet Vol. 15/2 (February–March  1988), pp. 36–38.
Ware, Allan. “A Chat With Professor Milenko Stefanovic and His Son Predrag.” The Clarinet Vol. 15/3 (May–June 1988), pp. 30–33.
Žabeva, Julijana. ”Presentations of Serbian Musicians at the Ohrid Summer Festival 1961–1991.” New Sound  29 (2007), pp. 81–98

External links
Prof. Milenko Stefanovic – video by Predrag Stefanović
Vreme muzike by Maja Čolović Vasić (dedicated to Milenko Stefanović), Radio Belgrade 2, 3 March 2016
Varteks Baronijan: Divertimento, clar. Milenko Stefanović
Dejan Despić: Concertino for clarinet, bassoon and orchestra, clar. Milenko Stefanović
 Ludmila Frajt: "A Musician and Birds" (1966), M. Stefanović – clarinet, SO RTB conducted by D. Miladinović (1968)
G. Gershwin: The Man I Love, clar. Milenko Stefanović
B. Kessel: Bernardo, clar. Milenko Stefanović
Aleksandar Obradović: Concerto for Clarinet and String Orchestra, performed by Milenko Stefanović
Camille Saint-Saëns: Sonata for clarinet and piano, Op. 167, performed by Milenko Stefanović and Zorica Dimitrijević-Stošić (first and second movements)
Camille Saint-Saëns: Sonata for clarinet and piano, Op. 167, performed by Milenko Stefanović and Zorica Dimitrijević-Stošić (third and fourth movements)

Stevan Markićević Sextet, clar. Milenko Stefanović
George Gershwin: "Summertime", clar. Milenko Stefanović, piano Nikola Rackov
Carl Maria Weber: Concertino in E-flat Major, performed on 25 March 1967 in the BBC Gala Concert Hall program, by Milenko Stefanović, clarinet and the BBC Concert Orchestra conducted by Marcus Dods
"Mera za muziku" – interview with Prof. Milenko Stefanović, Radio Television of Serbia, 28 March 2016
"Sećanje na klarinetistu Milenka Stefanovića" by Maja Čolović Vasić, Radio Belgrade 2, August 4, 2022

1930 births
2022 deaths
Musicians from Belgrade
Serbian classical clarinetists
Serbian jazz clarinetists
University of Arts in Belgrade alumni
Academic staff of the University of Arts in Belgrade
University of Belgrade alumni
Academic staff of the University of Pristina
Yugoslav musicians
21st-century clarinetists